The Michigan Wolverines swimming and diving program has both a men's and women's team. The University of Michigan swimming program is one of the most highly respected college swimming programs in the country. The men's and women's teams, which had been coached separately, were combined in August 2012 by the University of Michigan Athletic Department under the leadership of head coach Mike Bottom.

Men's swimming

Tradition
The University of Michigan Men's Swimming and Diving team has a rich tradition of producing quality swimmers and being one of the nation's top programs. Men's swimming and diving has been a varsity sport at Michigan since 1921.  With 19 total national championships — 12 official NCAA championships and seven unofficial NCAA national championships — the Michigan men's swimming and diving team has won more national championships than any other varsity sport in the history of the university. In addition, Michigan holds 42 Big Ten Titles in its history with its most recent title coming in the 2020-21 season. The team has won more Big Ten titles than any other program. Michigan has enjoyed great success as of late, finishing as a top-10 team in the NCAA's nine out of the last ten seasons, with its best finish coming in the 2012-13 season, in which they won the national championship. Michigan's total of 19 national championships in Swimming and Diving is the most of any team in history.

Coaching history

The University of Michigan Men's Swimming program began in 1921 and has had nine coaches in its history. The current coach is Mike Bottom, who became head coach after the departure of Bob Bowman in 2008. In five years at Michigan, Bottom has compiled dual-meet record of 40-3-1 (25-1 against Big Ten opponents) while winning four Big Ten Championships (2009, 2011–13) and an NCAA Championship (2013). He is a three-time Big Ten Swimming Coach of the Year (2011–13) and was the 2013 CSCAA Swimming Coach of the Year.

The coaching history is as follows:
 Mike Bottom (2008–present)
 Bob Bowman (2004–08)
 Record 30-8-1 in dual meets, including 21-1-1 against Big Ten opponents, Big Ten Championships: 1.
 Jon Urbanchek (1982–2004)
Record 163-34-0, Big Ten Championships: 13, National Championships: 1
 Bill Farley (1979–81)
Record 14-4-0
 Gus Stager (1954–79,1981–82)
Record 188-40-1, Big Ten Championships: 3, National Championships: 4
 Matthew Mann (1925–54)
Record 203-25-3, Big Ten Championships: 16, National Championships: 13
 Gerald Barnes (1924–25)
Record 4-0-0
 William Brown (1922–24)
Record 3-4-1
 John Jerome (1921–22)
Record 0-1-0

Alumni
There are many notable alumni that have come from the University of Michigan Swimming program. These include many Olympians and NCAA Champions.

Gustavo Borges
Fernando Cañales (1981)
John Davies
Tom Dolan
Brian Gunn
Tom Malchow
Strother Martin
Eric Namesnik
Richard O. Papenguth(1925)
Andy Potts
Owen Von Richter
Carl Robie
Davis Tarwater
Chris Thompson (2001)
Jon Urbanchek
Alex Vanderkaay
Peter Vanderkaay
Steve West
Marcel Wouda
Eric Wunderlich
Salvatore Barba
Connor Jaeger
Tyler Clary

Women's swimming

History 
The University of Michigan Women's Swimming program has been a varsity sport since 1974. The current coach is Mike Bottom, who took over in August 2012, when the men's and women's teams were combined. He took over the post from head coach Jim Richardson who had been head coach of the Women's swim team for 27 years. Richardson announced his retirement on May 16, 2012. His teams won 12 consecutive Big Ten Conference titles from 1987 to 1998.

Coaching history
The coaching history is as follows:

Johanna High (1975)
 Record 3-1-0

Stu Isaac (1976-1983)
 Record 47-7-0, Big Ten Championships: 5

Peter Lindsay (1984-1985)
 Record 7-10-0

Jim Richardson (1986–2012)
 Record overall: 175-77-0, Big Ten: 114-25-0, Big Ten Championships: 14

Mike Bottom (2012–present)

Alumni 
 Mindy Gehrs
 Ann Colloton
 Siobhán Haughey

U-M in the International Swimming Hall of Fame
Michigan's rich history in swimming and diving is evidenced by the 18 former student-athletes and coaches enshrined in the International Swimming Hall of Fame, located in Ft. Lauderdale, Florida. Individuals may be inducted into the International Swimming Hall of Fame as a swimmer, diver, water polo player, synchronized swimmer, coach or contributor. Criteria for selection into the Hall of Fame include achievements at the Olympic, World Championship and national levels, as well as world records held. Athletes must be retired from competition a minimum of four years, or at least one Olympic quadrennial. Individuals who are neither competitors nor coaches may be elected as a "contributor" whose achievements and innovations have had a profound effect on swimming and/or its administration.

ISHOF members
 Tom Malchow (2014), Swimming,
 Mike Barrowman (1997), Swimming, 
 Gustavo Borges (2012), Swimming, 
 John Davies (1984), Swimming, 
 William "Buck" Dawson (1986), Contributor, 
 Dick Degener (1971), Diving, 
 Tom Dolan (2006), Swimming, 
 Taylor Drysdale (1994), Swimming, 
 Virginia Duenkel (1985), Swimming, 
 Jamison "Jam" Handy (1965), Contributor, 
 Bruce Harlan (1973), Diving, 
 Harry Holiday (1991), Swimming, 
 Dick Kimball (1985), Coach/Diving, 
 Micki King (1978), Diving, 
 Matt Mann II (1965), Coach, 
 Robert Mowerson (1986), Coach, 
 Richard Papenguth (1986), Coach, 
 Carl Robie (1976), Swimming, 
 Gus Stager (1982), Coach, 
 Jon Urbanchek (2008), Coach, 
 Bob Webster (1970), Diving,

Club Wolverine

About
The USA club swimming team that is affiliated with University team is Club Wolverine. The college swimmers train with the Club Wolverine Elite Team during the summer, but Club Wolverine is a very diverse organization that goes beyond its affiliation with the university. Club Wolverine is a parent run swim team for swimmers of all ages and abilities. It is routinely ranked the #1 club in Michigan and one of the top clubs in the U.S. CW's focus is on the long-term development of swimmers from learn-to-swim (Cubs Group) to local, state, national and international competition.

Professional swimming 
Club Wolverine has always had an impressive squad of professional swimmers including many international superstars in the sport. Most notably, Michael Phelps trained on Club Wolverine for the four years leading up to the 2008 Beijing Olympics.

Summer camps
The Club Wolverine team in congruence with the University of Michigan Varsity Swimming program runs a week-long stay-away camp in the summer. This camp is intended to be for young, but competitive swimmers that are looking to improve their skills in an environment that provides relatively high intensity. These young swimmers are coached personally on technique, endurance and speed by the Coaching staff of the University's varsity team and by professional and college athletes themselves. Most young swimmers that attend the camps stay in the University dorms. Campers are given opportunities to have fun by playing games, watching movies, and meeting inspiring athletes at the autograph signing and game night.

Diving program
The University of Michigan Varsity Diving Team is an integral part of both swimming teams. The diving team has a rich history. Dick Kimball, an alumnus and Olympic diving coach, retired as diving coach in 2002.

References

External links
UM Men's Swimming and Diving
UM Women's Swimming and Diving